Khvoshganab (also Romanized as Khvoshganāb and Khvoshgnāb; also known as Khoshgnāb) is a village in Khanamrud Rural District, in the Central District of Heris County, East Azerbaijan Province, Iran. At the 2006 census, its population was 265, in 65 families.

References 

Populated places in Heris County